Solanum goniocalyx may refer to two different species of plant:
 Solanum goniocalyx, a synonym for Solanum campylacanthum, a species of plant found in Africa
 Solanum goniocalyx, a synonym for Solanum tuberosum, commonly known as the potato plant